Fatric Bewong is an artist and a teacher.

Early life and education 
She studied Bachelor of Fine Arts (BFA) at Kwame Nkrumah University of Science and Technology and holds a Master of Fine Arts degree from the University of Hartford.

Reference 

Year of birth missing (living people)
Living people
Interdisciplinary artists